Scott Joseph Rehberg (born November 17, 1973) is a former professional American football offensive lineman. He played seven seasons in the National Football League (NFL) for the New England Patriots, Cleveland Browns, and Cincinnati Bengals. 

He was inducted into Central Michigan University's athletic Hall of Fame in 2014. He was a four-year letterwinner and three-year starter at left tackle. He earned First-team All-Mid-American Conference honors in 1996 and Second-team in 1995. He helped CMU to the MAC Championship in 1994, helping pave the way for three consecutive 1,000-yard rushers in Brian Pruitt (`94), Silas Massey ('95 and '96) ... Pruitt's 1,890-yard season in '94 and Massey's 1,544-yard effort in '96 remain the top two single-season rushing totals in CMU history ... key cog up front on '96 team that led MAC in total offense and scoring, ranking as NCAA's 7th-best offense ... named to the Academic All-MAC team in `95 and '96 ... selected by New England Patriots in 7th round of 1997 NFL draft ... played 79 NFL games, starting 27 over seven-year career with Patriots, Cincinnati Bengals and Cleveland Browns ... selected to play in the Hula Bowl, a college football all-star game, in 1997. 

1973 births
Living people
Sportspeople from Kalamazoo, Michigan
Players of American football from Michigan
American football offensive guards
American football offensive tackles
Central Michigan Chippewas football players
New England Patriots players
Cleveland Browns players
Cincinnati Bengals players